OX-2 membrane glycoprotein, also named CD200 (Cluster of Differentiation 200)  is a human protein encoded by the  gene.

The protein encoded by this gene is a type-1 membrane glycoprotein, which contains two immunoglobulin domains, and thus belongs to the immunoglobulin superfamily. Studies of the related genes in mouse and rat suggest that this gene may regulate myeloid cell activity and delivers an inhibitory signal for the macrophage lineage in diverse tissues. Multiple alternatively spliced transcript variants that encode different isoforms have been found for this gene.

See also
 Cluster of differentiation

References

Further reading

External links
 
 
 

Clusters of differentiation